Vstrechny is an inhabited locality (an urban-type settlement) in Bilibinsky District of Chukotka Autonomous Okrug, Russia, located about  ENE of Bilibino. Population: 13 (2002 Census),  The 2002 census data shows the population to consist of 12 males and 1 female, though this had fallen to only 7 by 2005 according to an environmental impact report prepared on the Kupol mining project.

History

Soviet period
The settlement, located on the right hand bank of the Enmynveyem River, was originally created like many throughout this part of Chukotka following the establishment of a mine nearby (Initially called Vstrechny itself) in 1961 to extract gold from the Enmynveyem to house the workers. Two years later however, the mine's name was changed to "45 Years of the Komsomol". In 1965, the settlement received the status of urban-type settlement.

Post-Soviet period
When the mines were deemed to be uneconomic, the settlement was abandoned and mostly depopulated by 1996. In 2004, a road was completed linking the settlement with the regional centre, giving hope that the settlement can continue. However, as of 2009, Vstrechny is included in the list of settlements currently in the process of being liquidated.

Population
The mines were declared unprofitable and that there was no possibility of developing any other form of economy in 1999 and the settlement was closed along with a number of others in Chukotka. The Russian government guaranteed funds to transport non-working pensioners and the unemployed in liquidated settlements including Baranikha from Chukotka to other parts of Russia. The Ministry of railways was obliged to lease containers for the transportation of the migrants' goods to the Chukotkan administration and ensure that they were delivered to the various settlements. The population table below shows the impact on the settlement as a result of the closure of the mines.

Transport
Vstrechny is linked to Bilibino and Keperveyem by a small road network that also links the now abandoned settlements of Bezmyanniy and Karalvaam. There is also a small network of roads within the settlement including:

 Улица Коммунальная (Ulitsa Kommumalnaya, lit. Communal Street)
 Улица Космонавтов (Ulitsa Kosmonavtov, lit. Cosmonaut Street)
 Улица Ленина (Ulitsa Lenina, lit. Lenin Street)
 Улица Мира (Ulitsa Mira, lit. World Street)
 Улица Центральная (Ulitsa Tsentralnaya, lit. Central Street)
 Улица Юбилейная (Ulitsa Yubileinaya, lit. Jubilee Street)

Climate
Vstrechny has a Continental Subarctic or Boreal (taiga) climate (Dfc).

See also
List of inhabited localities in Bilibinsky District

References

Notes

Sources
Bema Gold Corporation, Environmental Impact Assessment, Kupol Gold Project, Far East Russia June 2005.

 

Urban-type settlements in Chukotka Autonomous Okrug
Populated places of Arctic Russia